Przemysław Matyjaszek (born April 24, 1978, in Ruda Śląska) is a Polish judoka.

He competed at the Olympic Games in the 90 kg event in 2004 and in the 100 kg event in 2008.

Achievements

References

External links
 
 

1978 births
Living people
Polish male judoka
Olympic judoka of Poland
Judoka at the 2004 Summer Olympics
Judoka at the 2008 Summer Olympics
Sportspeople from Ruda Śląska
21st-century Polish people